The Antonov An-325 is an evolution project of Antonov An-225 "Mriya" designed to launch spacecraft of various purposes into circular, elliptical and high-circle orbits, including geostationary orbit. It was planned to be an enlarged and improved version of the An-225, but it was never built.

History

Development 
In the 1980s, the Russian SFSR and Ukrainian SSR pursued a project of Multipurpose aerospace system (MAKS). Its essence was to use the An-325 carrier aircraft (based on the "Mriya") to launch an orbital plane. According to the project, at an altitude of ten thousand meters the carrier was to make a "slide" with separation from the aircraft "shuttle" at the time of descent. After separation the orbital plane was to go into the orbit on its own engines, and the An-325 was to leave for landing. Advantages of MAKS were considered: absence of tie-up with the spaceport, possibility to rescue crews on space objects and high-altitude reconnaissance.

The idea of launching spacecraft by air launch has existed for a long time. Since the An-124 Ruslan aircraft was created, there has been an idea of creating a system to launch a space rocket at an altitude of 8-11 kilometers and put its payload into orbit. Similar concepts have emerged in Europe and North America. While the USSR was working on creation of MAKS, other countries were working on their own airborne rockets. One was by the United Kingdom, developing HOTOL in the same timeframe. With the appearance of the An-225 in the USSR and its design for air-launch of such products, the idea of combining the projects arose.

British involvement 

In July 1990, British Aerospace and the Soviet Ministry of Aviation Industry agreed to study the feasibility of air-launching an interim version of HOTOL from the back of the Soviet Union's Antonov An-225 heavy-lift transport aircraft. The 6-month Joint Study Program was carried out concurrently in the Soviet Union and the United Kingdom, with data and analyses shared between the two organizations, leading to the design of the An-325.

On June 21, 1991, The An-225 and the 250-ton reusable Interim HOTOL spacecraft developed by British Aerospace were presented as part of a joint international aerospace system for near-Earth space exploration programme at the European Space Agency's headquarters in Paris. When compared to Vertical launch, the implementation of this project promised a fourfold decrease in the cost of orbital payload placement. In addition to other things, HOTOL could more efficiently address the issue of getting crews to orbital stations and removing them from there in an emergency.

But due to the complexity and technological limitations at the time, it did not ensure the implementation of such a project in a single stage. Neither the UK government at the time nor the ESA, which was busy with its own projects, "Hermes" and "Ariane", agreed to finance these works. Eventually funding ceased, development stopped, and the project was frozen for more than 20 years. This was then exacerbated due to economic issues and the Dissolusion of the Soviet Union, leading to its cancelation. Only in 2012, the project received interests, and at the moment it is still under discussion. Only in this case it is no longer within the framework of the Space race, but as an aircraft for private aviation.

Project 
The An-325 was to have two additional engines, which were to be mounted on the respective inner engine mounts in a manner comparable to the U.S. Boeing B-47. This would have resulted in an eight-engine aircraft with six engine nacelles. The An-325 was designed on the basis of the An-225, with a difference of increasing the dimensions and adding an additional compartment for aviation fuel. Since the weight of fuel that the plane could carry, exceeded the volume of space that the plane could hold, the An-325 was equipped with a rocket on the fuselage mounts to transport the external tank. 

In the case of Interim HOTOL, it would be carried by the An-325 during an approximately hour-long flight to an altitude of 9 km and the proper release point after liquid hydrogen/liquid oxygen were supplied to the Orbiter on the ground. From an altitude of roughly 9.4 km, the AN-325 would begin a shallow dive, briefly increasing it's degree at about 15 seconds to release the Orbiter, and then continuing the dive to avoid the engine exhaust plume. The Interim HOTOL's vehicle's four engines would start in pairs just before and just after release, and the ignition sequence would be finished 4 to 6 seconds later. Once separation is complete the An-325 would successfully return to the ground. The plane, which never got beyond the planning stage, was intended as a launch platform for Russian and foreign spacecraft.

See also

References 

Cancelled aircraft projects
Eight-engined jet aircraft
Twin-tail aircraft
Aircraft related to spaceflight
Antonov aircraft